Tosena mearesiana is a cicada species from Southeast Asia. It was described in 1842 by Westwood from a specimen originating from the Himalayas. It has also been recorded from Sikkim in India.

References

Insects described in 1842
Hemiptera of Asia
Taxa named by John O. Westwood
Tosenini